Choreutis equatoris is a species of moth of the family Choreutidae. It is found in the Republic of the Congo.

References

Endemic fauna of the Republic of the Congo
Choreutis
Fauna of the Republic of the Congo
Moths of Africa
Moths described in 1897